Belliella is a Gram-negative, aerobic, chemoheterotrophic and non-motile bacterial genus from the family of Cyclobacteriaceae.

References

Further reading 
 
 
 
 

Cytophagia
Bacteria genera